Huang Yunlong (born 10 July 1960) is a Chinese former basketball player who competed in the 1984 Summer Olympics and in the 1988 Summer Olympics.

References

1960 births
Living people
Chinese men's basketball players
1982 FIBA World Championship players
Olympic basketball players of China
Basketball players at the 1984 Summer Olympics
Basketball players at the 1988 Summer Olympics
Asian Games medalists in basketball
Basketball players at the 1982 Asian Games
Basketball players at the 1986 Asian Games
Asian Games gold medalists for China
Asian Games silver medalists for China
Medalists at the 1982 Asian Games
Medalists at the 1986 Asian Games
Sportspeople from Quanzhou
Basketball players from Fujian
20th-century Chinese people
21st-century Chinese people